Takarazuka City General Gymnasium is an arena in Takarazuka, Hyogo, Japan.

References

Basketball venues in Japan
Indoor arenas in Japan
Nishinomiya Storks
Sports venues in Hyōgo Prefecture
Takarazuka, Hyōgo